Wolonkoto   is a small department or commune of Léraba Province in south-western  Burkina Faso. Its capital lies at the town of Wolonkoto. According to the 1996 census the department has a total population of 3,687.

Towns and villages

 Wolonkoto	(2 694 inhabitants) (capital)
 Malon	(993 inhabitants)

References

Departments of Burkina Faso
Léraba Province